Lappenberg may refer to:

 Lappenberg (Hildesheim)
 Johann Martin Lappenberg